Rugby Clube de Loulé is a rugby union team based in Loulé, Portugal. As of the 2012/13 season, they play in the First Division of the Campeonato Nacional de Rugby (National Championship).

Staff
Head coach: André Gomes
Assistant coach: Rui Mendonça
Assistant coach: João Matos 

Lima
Assistant coach: Nuno Otão
Physiotherapist:

External links
Rugby Clube de Loulé

Portuguese rugby union teams
Sport in Loulé